Valencian Democrats (DV) is a centrist, Valencianist political party founded in the Valencian Community in 2013 and reactivated in 2017. In 2018, the party achieved some agreements with some local independent parties and in total reached 17 city councilmen.

In September 2018, Natxo Temiño was elected Secretary-General of the party. In December he was substituted by Albert Sarrió.

Ideology
According to its statutes, DV is defined as a "centrist and valencianist" formation, with a "conciliation Valencianism" (also known as Valencianist Third Way) line (overcoming the confrontation between pro-Catalan fusterianism and anti-Catalan blaverism).

References

External links
  (in Catalan)

2013 establishments in the Valencian Community
Centrist parties in Spain
Political parties established in 2013
Political parties in the Valencian Community
Regionalist parties in Spain
Valencian nationalism